Zadoi County (also Dzatö or Dzatoe) is a county in the southwest of Qinghai Province, China, bordering the Tibet Autonomous Region to the south. It is under the administration of Yushu Tibetan Autonomous Prefecture. The county seat is in the Town of Qapugtang.

Administrative divisions
Zadoi County (Zaduo County) is divided to 1 towns and 7 townships.
Towns
 Sahuteng

Townships

Climate

References

External links
Official website of the County government

County-level divisions of Qinghai
Yushu Tibetan Autonomous Prefecture